Ekspress-AM8 ( meaning Express-AM8) is a Russian communications satellite which was launched in 2015. Part of the Ekspress series of geostationary communications satellites, it is owned and operated by the RSCC Space Communications.

Satellite description 
Thales Alenia Space, constructed Ekspress-AM8 payload, and ISS Reshetnev constructed the satellite bus which was based on the Ekspress-1000NTB. The satellite carried 62 transponders: 24 operating in the C-band of the electromagnetic spectrum, 12 in the Ku-band and 2 in the L-band.

Mission 
The satellite is designed to provide TV and radio broadcasting services, data transmission, multimedia services, telephony, and mobile communications.

Launch 
Ekspress-AM8 was originally to be launched in 2012 or 2013 into RSCC's 14° West longitude, but was delayed to 2015. It used a Proton-M / Blok DM-03 launch vehicle to be inserted directly into geostationary orbit.

See also 

 2015 in spaceflight

References 

Ekspress satellites
Spacecraft launched in 2015
Satellites using the Ekspress bus
2015 in Russia